The Krillitane Storm  is a BBC Books original novel written by Christopher Cooper and based on the long-running British science fiction television series Doctor Who. It features the Tenth Doctor without an official companion. It was released on 3 September 2009 alongside The Taking of Chelsea 426 and Autonomy.

It is the 10th Doctor's final novel in the New Series Adventures (not including original audio books or Code of the Krillitanes).

Synopsis
The Doctor arrives in Worcester in 1139. There have been disappearances in last few months and people live in terror, afraid to leave their dwellings once the dark falls. When the Doctor meets with a Krillitane, he knows they have every reason to be afraid.

Background
Though there is no official companion featured in the novel, there are guest companions named Emily and captain James Darke.

See also

Whoniverse

References

External links

The Cloister Library - The Krillitane Storm

Fiction set in the 1130s
Novels set in the 12th century
2009 British novels
2009 science fiction novels
New Series Adventures
Tenth Doctor novels
Novels set in Worcestershire